Parliamentary elections were held in Iran on 17 September 1963. The result was a victory for the New Iran Party, which won 140 of the 200 seats. Voter turnout was 91.7%.

It was held a few months after the 'White Revolution referendum' and the subsequent demonstrations in June.

Before the elections, opposition figures such as the National Front and the Freedom Movement activists were jailed and no genuine opposition candidates were permitted in the elections. The National Front had requested Prime Minister Asadollah Alam to hold the elections free, but the request was rebuffed. The elections were "rigged and far from a legitimate process".

Results

References

1963 elections in Asia
1963 elections in Iran
Iranian Senate elections
National Consultative Assembly elections
Lower house elections in Iran
September 1963 events in Asia